Rangitāne is a Māori iwi (tribe). Their rohe (territory) is in the Manawatū, Horowhenua, Wairarapa and Marlborough areas of New Zealand.

Rangitāne in Manawatū

 Six hapū are based share Te Hotu Manawa marae and Tūturu Pumau wharenui in Palmerston North – Ngāti Hineaute, Ngāti Kapuārangi, Ngāti Rangiaranaki, Ngāti Rangitepaia and Ngāti Tauira & Ngāti Mairehau.
 A seventh hapū, Ngāti Mairehau, has the Motuiti mare and Rakau or Paewai wharenui in Himatangi.

Rangitāne o Wairau

Rangitāne o Wairau has a rohe over Marlborough, including much of Kahurangi National Park, Nelson Lakes National Park, Mount Richmond Forest Park and the Marlborough Sounds. Its marae (Tua Mātene) and wharenui (Te Huataki) are in Grovetown, just north of Blenheim. However, its rohe also includes the city of Nelson, and the towns of Tākaka, Motueka, Saint Arnaud and Picton.

Te Runanga a Rangitāne o Wairau Trust represents the iwi under the Māori Fisheries Act and Māori Commercial Aquaculture Claims Settlement Act 2004. It is run by an executive committee of ten trustees and a chairperson. Iwi Aquaculture Organisation in the Māori Commercial Aquaculture Claims Settlement Act 2004. Rangitāne o Wairau Settlement Trust governs the iwi's Treaty of Waitangi settlement under the Ngāti Apa ki te Rā Tō, Ngāti Kuia, and Rangitāne o Wairau Claims Settlement Act, and represents the iwi in resource consent consultation under the Resource Management Act 1991. Both trusts share managers and offices in Blenheim.

Rangitāne o Wairau's chief executive/general manager is Corey Hebberd.

The iwi has interests in the territory of Tasman District Council, Nelson City Council and Marlborough District Council. It also has a working relationship with Kaikoura District Council and Buller District Council on issues relating to waterways, catchment areas and coastal areas.

Rangitāne o Tamaki-nui-a-rua

Rangitāne rohe on the eastern side of the Ruahine/Tararua Ranges stretches from Rakautatahi through to Eketahuna. This rohe is centered on the town of Dannevirke, where there are three Rangitāne Marae, Mākirikiri, Kaitoki, and Whiti-te-rā.

Demographics

Rangitāne (Hawke’s Bay/Wairarapa)
1991 census: 156
2001 census: 1,197
2006 census: 1,566
2013 census: 2,217
Major regional locations
 Wellington: 822
 Manawatū–Wanganui: 543
 Hawke's Bay: 288

Rangitāne (Manawatū)
 1991 census: 330
 2001 census: 822
 2006 census: 1,281
 2013 census: 1,488
Major regional locations
 Manawatū–Wanganui: 744
 Wellington: 201

Rangitāne (unspecified)
 1991 census: 3,003
 2001 census: 1,689
 2006 census: 1,569
 2013 census: 94

Media
Kia Ora FM is the official radio station of the Rangitāne people. It began as Radio Rangitane, or Te Reo Irirangi O Rangitane, on 1 May 1992, and adopted its current name in the 2000s.

Notable Rangitāne 

 India Logan-Riley - climate activist

See also
List of Māori iwi

References

Further reading
McEwen, J. M. Rangitane: a tribal history. Auckland: Heinemann Reed, 1990.

External links

Tānenuiārangi Manawatū Incorporated
Rangitāne o Tamaki nui a rua Incorporated

 
Iwi and hapū